The 1984–85 daytime network television schedule for the three major English-language commercial broadcast networks in the United States covers the weekday and weekend daytime hours from September 1984 to August 1985.

Legend

 New series are highlighted in bold.

Schedule
 All times correspond to U.S. Eastern and Pacific Time scheduling (except for some live sports or events). Except where affiliates slot certain programs outside their network-dictated timeslots, subtract one hour for Central, Mountain, Alaska, and Hawaii-Aleutian times.
 Local schedules may differ, as affiliates have the option to pre-empt or delay network programs. Such scheduling may be limited to preemptions caused by local or national breaking news or weather coverage (which may force stations to tape delay certain programs to other timeslots) and any major sports events scheduled to air in a weekday timeslot (mainly during major holidays). Stations may air shows at other times at their preference.

Monday–Friday

ABC note: The Edge of Night aired its final episode on December 28, 1984. Afterwards, ABC rescinded the 4:00 pm time slot to its local stations. Many affiliates had already dropped the show by the time it was canceled.

Saturday

In the News aired at the end of most of CBS' Saturday morning shows (exceptions included Muppet Babies and CBS Storybreak).

One to Grow On aired after the credits of NBC's Saturday morning shows except Mister T and two other shows.

Sunday

By network

ABC

Returning series
ABC Weekend Special
ABC World News This Morning
ABC World News Tonight with Peter Jennings
All My Children
American Bandstand
Celebrity Family Feud
The Edge of Night
Family Feud
General Hospital
Good Morning America
The Littles
Loving
The New Scooby-Doo Mysteries
One Life to Live
The Puppy's Great Adventures
Rubik, the Amazing Cube 
Ryan's Hope
Schoolhouse Rock!
This Week with David Brinkley

New Series
ABC Funfit
All-Star Blitz
Angie 
Dragon's Lair
Mighty Orbots
Scary Scooby Funnies
Superfriends: The Legendary Super Powers Show
Trivia Trap
Turbo Teen
Wolf Rock TV

Not Returning From 1983-84
Benson 
The Best of Scooby-Doo
The Love Report
Menudo on ABC
The Monchhichis/Little Rascals/Richie Rich Show
The New Scooby and Scrappy-Doo Show (Retooled into The New Scooby-Doo Mysteries)
Pac-Man

CBS

Returning Series
The $25,000 Pyramid
As the World Turns
The Biskitts 
Body Language
The Bugs Bunny/Road Runner Show
Capitol
Captain Kangaroo
CBS Evening News
CBS Morning News
CBS News Sunday Morning
The Charlie Brown and Snoopy Show
Dungeons & Dragons
Face the Nation
Guiding Light
Land of the Lost 
Press Your Luck
The Price Is Right
Saturday Supercade
Shirt Tales 
The Young and the Restless

New Series
CBS Storybreak
The Get Along Gang
Jim Henson's Muppet Babies
Pole Position
Pryor's Place

Not Returning From 1983-84
Benji, Zax & the Alien Prince 
CBS Children's Film Festival
The Dukes
Gilligan's Planet 
Meatballs and Spaghetti 
The New Fat Albert Show
Plastic Man 
Tarzan, Lord of the Jungle 
Tattletales

NBC

Returning Series
Alvin and the Chipmunks
Another World
Days of Our Lives
The Facts of Life 
The Incredible Hulk 
Meet the Press
Mister T
NBC News at Sunrise
NBC Nightly News
Sale of the Century
Santa Barbara
Scrabble
Search for Tomorrow
The Smurfs
Spider-Man and His Amazing Friends 
Today
Wheel of Fortune

New Series
Going Bananas
Kidd Video
Pink Panther and Sons
Silver Spoons 
Snorks
Super Password
Time Machine

Not Returning From 1983-84
Diff'rent Strokes 
Dream House
The Flintstone Funnies
GO
Hot Potato
Match Game-Hollywood Squares Hour
Shirt Tales
Thundarr the Barbarian

See also
1984-85 United States network television schedule (prime-time)
1984-85 United States network television schedule (late night)

Sources
https://web.archive.org/web/20071015122215/http://curtalliaume.com/abc_day.html
https://web.archive.org/web/20071015122235/http://curtalliaume.com/cbs_day.html
https://web.archive.org/web/20071012211242/http://curtalliaume.com/nbc_day.html

United States weekday network television schedules
1984 in American television
1985 in American television